The Biak coucal (Centropus chalybeus) is a species of cuckoo in the family Cuculidae.
It is endemic to West Papua, Indonesia.

Its natural habitat is subtropical or tropical moist lowland forest.
It is threatened by habitat loss.

References

Biak coucal
Birds of the Schouten Islands
Biak coucal
Taxonomy articles created by Polbot
Endemic fauna of the Biak–Numfoor rain forests